Daouitherium ("Sidi Daoui beast" from the name of the site where it was discovered) is an extinct genus of early proboscideans (a group including modern elephants and their extinct relatives) that lived during the early Eocene (Ypresian stage) some 55 million years ago in North Africa.

Remains of this animal, fragments of jaws and teeth, have been found in the Ouled Abdoun Basin in Morocco.

Description
Daouitherium is known only from lower jaws and associated cheek teeth. It had lophodont and bilophodont molars, i.e. molars with large ridges. The second and third premolars had a notably large cusp called the hypoconid. Gheerbrant et al. described the teeth as similar to those of other early proboscideans Phosphatherium, Numidotherium, and Barytherium.

See also
Fauna of Africa

References 

Eocene proboscideans
Fossils of Morocco
Fossil taxa described in 2002
Prehistoric placental genera
Eocene mammals of Africa